Joanna Newsom and the Ys Street Band is an EP by Joanna Newsom, first released on April 9, 2007, via Drag City.

The EP was recorded and mixed over three days at The Plant Studios after Joanna had cancelled three consecutive shows due to a lost voice at the end of her seven-week-long U.S. tour. It contains one previously unreleased song, "Colleen", and new arrangements of two previously released songs; "Clam, Crab, Cockle, Cowrie" from Milk-Eyed Mender and Walnut Whales and "Cosmia" from Ys.

The album title is a pun on the E Street Band, a musical group famous for backing up Bruce Springsteen.

The cover is a photograph by William Eggleston.

Track listing
"Colleen" – 6:41
"Clam, Crab, Cockle, Cowrie" (New arrangement) – 4:02
"Cosmia" (New arrangement) – 13:23

Charts

Personnel
 Joanna Newsom – harp, vocals
 Ryan Francesconi – tambura, guitar
 Dan Cantrell – accordion, musical saw
 Neal Morgan – drum, vocals
 Kevin Barker – banjo, guitar

References

External links
Joanna Newsom Unveils EP Details

2007 EPs
Joanna Newsom albums
Drag City (record label) EPs